Adel Tamano is a Filipino lawyer and educator. He is the current Chief Administrative Officer, Chief of Humans Resources, and Corporate Secretary of DITO Telecommunity Corporation. He gained prominence as the spokesperson for the United Opposition party in 2007 and was part of the senatorial lineup in 2010.

Early Life and Education
Tamano was born on October 2, 1970 in Manila to Senator Mamintal Tamano and civic leader Hadja Putri Zorayda Abbas Tamano. He was their 8th child. 

An accomplished and involved student, Tamano started his academic career at The Ateneo de Manila University with a degree in Economics. From there, he obtained multiple degrees: a Juris Doctor from the Ateneo de Manila University, a Master’s in Public Administration from the University of the Philippines (2003), and a Master of Laws from Harvard Law School (2005). He was a Class Marshall at Harvard and has been recognized as one of the distinguished alumni of The University of the Philippines.

Professional Career 
Working under the esteemed Estelito P. Mendoza, Tamano received a practical education in the law and went on to work as an associate with several prestigious law firms. He opened his firm in 2004.

Tamano is deeply committed to education. He has worked as a teacher and administrator of a few schools and universities. He served as Dean for the College of Law of Liceo de Cagayan University in Cagayan de Oro from 2011 to 2012. Before that, he was the University President of the Pamantasan ng Lungsod ng Maynila from 2007 to 2009.

Also in 2011, Tamano joined the corporate world when he was brought on as Vice President for Public Affairs and Communications for Coca-Cola Philippines. From there he excelled, eventually achieving the position of Vice President for Corporate Affairs for the Udenna Corporation. 

In 2019, he took the helm as Chief Administrative Officer, Chief of Humans Resources, and Corporate Secretary of DITO Telecommunity Corporation. Under his watch, the company has been growing in the difficult Philippine market.

Career Highlights 
Tamano led the DITO organization in the bidding, establishment, and commercial launch of the third telco in the Philippines.

He has held top-level government posts as University President (University of the City of Manila (2007-2009) and General Counsel of the Senate of the Philippines’ Committee on Justice (2007-2008).

As part of Coca-Cola Philippines, Tamano led the Public Affairs team and was given the Award for Corporate Enterprise by the US Secretary of State, John Kerry, in 2014.

Media 
In tandem with his law career, corporate positions, and work in academia, Tamano has also maintained a media presence and platform. He wrote a column in the Philippine Star, he even had a show on ANC, it was called “Tamano Perspective.”

Personal life 
Tamano is married to Atty. Rowena Kapunan. The couple has two sons.

References

External links 
 Twitter Account of Atty. Adel A. Tamano
 Harvard Commencement Speech

1970 births
Living people
Filipino educators
Filipino Muslims
Filipino people of Arab descent
People from Lanao del Sur
Pamantasan ng Lungsod ng Maynila
Ateneo de Manila University alumni
Academic staff of Ateneo de Manila University
Harvard Law School alumni
Presidents of universities and colleges in the Philippines
Deans of law schools in the Philippines